The Mount Mitchell Challenge is a 40-mile Ultramarathon run in February of each year from the town of Black Mountain, NC to the top of Mt Mitchell, the highest point in the Eastern US, and back down again.  This race, intentionally run in Winter to ensure harsh conditions, is regarded as one of the most difficult trail-running races in North America.

Started in 1998 by locals businesses Black Dome Mountain Sports and Black Mountain Savings, the course has seen every type of weather imaginable...rain, ice, snow, sun...and runners keep coming back...several for all of its editions.

External links
Mount Mitchell Challenge home page

See also
Mount Mitchell
Mount Mitchell State Park

Ultramarathons in the United States
Trail running competitions
1998 establishments in North Carolina